Events in the year 1891 in Brazil.

Incumbents

Federal government 
 President: Marshal Deodoro da Fonseca (de facto until 26 February, de jure from 26 February to 23 November), Marshal Floriano Peixoto (starting 23 November)
 Vice-President: Marshal Floriano Peixoto (de jure from 26 February to 23 November), vacant from 23 November

Governors 
 Alagoas: 
 until 12 June: Manuel de Araujo Gois
 12 June-16: Pedro Paulino de Fonseca
 16 June-23 November: Manuel de Araujo Gois
 23 November-28: Provisional Government
 starting 28 November: Manuel Gomes Riberio
 Amazonas: 
 until 5 May: Eduardo Gonçalves Ribeiro
 5 May-25 May: Guilherme José Moreira
 25 May-30 June: Guilherme José Moreira
 30 June-1 September: Gregório Taumaturgo Azevedo
 Bahia: José Gonçalves da Silva then Tude Soares Neiva then Leal Ferreira
 Ceará: 
 until 22 January: Luís Antônio Ferraz
 22 January-6 April: Benjamin Liberato Barroso
 6 April-28 April: Feliciano Antônio Benjamim
 starting 28 April: José Clarindo de Queirós
 Goiás:
 until 20 January: Rodolfo Gustavo da Paixão
 20 January-30 March: Bernardo Albernaz
 30 March-20 May: João Bonifácio Gomes de Siqueira
 20 May-18 July: Constâncio Ribeiro da Maia
 18 July-7 December: Rodolfo Gustavo da Paixão
 starting 7 December: Constâncio Ribeiro da Maia
 Maranhão: 
 Mato Grosso: Antonio Maria Coelho then Frederico Solon de Sampaio Ribeiro then José da Silva Rondon then João Nepomuceno de Medeiros Mallet
 Minas Gerais: 
 until 11 February: Chispim Jacques Bias Fortes
 11 February-17 March: Frederico Augusto Álvares da Silva
 17 March-16 June: Antônio Augusto de Lima
 16 June-18 June: Eduardo Ernesto da Gama Cerqueira
 starting 18 June: Cesário Alvim
 Pará:
 until 7 February: Justo Chermont
 7 February-25 March: Gentil Bittencourt
 25 March-24 June: Huet de Bacelar
 starting 24 June: Lauro Sodré
 Paraíba: Venâncio Neiva (until 27 November), Government Junta (from 27 November)
 Paraná: José Cerqueira de Aguiar Lima then Generoso Marques dos Santos then Roberto Ferreira Bento/José Lamenha Lins/Joaquim Monteiro de Carvalho e Silva
 Pernambuco: José Antônio Correia da Silva (until 27 November); José Maria de Albuquerque Melo (from 27 November)
 Piauí: 
 until 28 May: Álvaro Moreira de Barros Oliveira Lima 
 28 May-21 December: Gabriel Luís Ferreira
 21 December-29 December: Francisco Gomes Muniz 
 starting 29 December: Álvaro Lopes Machado
 Rio Grande do Norte: 
 until 2 March: Castro and Manuel do Nascimento Silva
 2 March-13 June: Amintas Francisco da Costa Barros
 13 June-6 August: José Inácio Fernandes Barros
 6 August-9 September: Francisco Gurgel de Oliveira
 9 September-28 November: Miguel Joaquim de Almeida Castro
 starting 12 November: Government Junta
 Rio Grande do Sul: 
 until 16 March: Cândido José da Costa
 16 March-15 July: Fernando Fernandes Abbott
 15 July-12 November: Júlio Prates de Castilhos
 starting 12 November: Military Junta
 Santa Catarina: 
 until 10 November: Gustavo Richard
 10 November-28 December: Lauro Miller 
 starting 28 December: Government Junta
 São Paulo: 
 until 7 March: Jorge Tibiriçá Piratininga
 7 March-11 June: Américo Brasiliense 
 11 June-15 December: Sérgio Tertuliano Castelo Branco
 Sergipe:
 26 January-27 May: Luis Mendes de Morais
 8 June-24 November: Vicente Ribeiro
 starting 24 November: vacant thereafter

Vice governors 
 Rio de Janeiro: 
 Rio Grande do Norte: 
 until 11 June: Government Junta
 11 June-16 December: José Alves de Cerqueira César
 starting 16 December: vacant
 São Paulo: 
 until 9 September: vacant
 9 September-28 November: Government Junta
 starting 28 November: vacant

Events 
 24 February – A new constitution is adopted by a Constitutional Congress.
 26 February – Presidential election: De facto President Deodoro da Fonseca is confirmed in post, gaining 55.61% of the vote.
 3 November – President Fonseca dissolves the National Congress and declares a "state of emergency". 
 23 November
 President Fonseca resigns from office, handing the position to Floriano Peixoto.
 Exiled Emperor Pedro II appears at the French Academy of Sciences for the last time to participate in an election.
 3 December – A sudden deterioration is noted in the health of Pedro II.
 9 December – Despite government repression, a popular gathering in memory of the deceased emperor occurred takes place, organized by the Marquis of Tamandaré, Viscount of Ouro Preto, Viscount of Sinimbu, Baron of Ladário, Carlos de Laet, Alfredo d' Escragnolle Taunay, Rodolfo Dantas, Afonso Celso and Joaquim Nabuco.
 date unknown – The daily newspaper Jornal do Brasil is founded.

Arts and culture

Books
Adolfo Caminha – A normalista

Births 
 10 April – Zélio Fernandino de Moraes, founder of the Umbanda Branca religion (d. 1975)
 21 July – Lasar Segall, Jewish painter, engraver and sculptor, died in Lithuania (d. 1957)
23 October – Pedro Ludovico, founder of Goiânia (d. 1979)

Deaths 

 22 January – Benjamin Constant Botelho de Magalhães, soldier, and politician (b. 1836)
 5 December – Pedro II of Brazil, exiled Emperor of Brazil (b. 1825)

References 

 
1890s in Brazil
Years of the 19th century in Brazil
Brazil
Brazil